Irwin may refer to:

Places
United States
 Irwin, California
 Irwin, Idaho
 Irwin, Illinois
 Irwin, Iowa
 Irwin, Nebraska
 Irwin, Ohio
 Irwin, Pennsylvania
 Irwin, South Carolina
 Irwin County, Georgia
 Irwin Township, Venango County, Pennsylvania
 Fort Irwin, California

Australia
 Shire of Irwin, Western Australia

People
 Irwin (given name)
 Irwin (surname)

Fruit 
 Irwin (mango), a mango variety from Florida

Other uses
 IRWIN, a painting collective that is a member of Neue Slowenische Kunst
 Irwin 41, an American sailboat design
 Irwin Toy, a Canadian toy manufacturer and distributor
 Irwin Industrial Tools, a subsidiary of Stanley Black & Decker
 Irwin Magnetic Systems, a computer storage manufacturer

See also 
 Earvin
 Ervin (disambiguation)
 Ervine
 Erving (disambiguation)
 Erwan
 Erwin (disambiguation)
 Irmin (disambiguation)
 Irvin
 Irvine (disambiguation)
 Irving (disambiguation)